Nactus galgajuga, also known as the Black Mountain gecko or Black Mountain slender-toed gecko is a species of lizard in the family Gekkonidae. It is endemic to Queensland in Australia.

References

Nactus
Geckos of Australia
Reptiles described in 1978